Your Excellency is a 2019 Nigerian political satire drama comedy film written and directed by Funke Akindele on her directorial debut. The film stars Akin Lewis and Funke Akindele in the lead roles. The film had its theatrical release across 50 theatres on 13 December 2019 and opened to positive reviews from critics. The film became a box office success and became the fourth highest grossing Nigerian film for the year 2019.

Cast 

 Akin Lewis as Chief Olalekan Ajadi
 Funke Akindele as Kemi Ajadi 
 Kemi Lala Akindoju as Lina
 Shafy Bello as Laide Ajadi
 Kunle Coker as Mallam Ali
 Eku Edewor as Eki Adua-Evans
 Alex Ekubo as Kachi
 Osas Ighodaro as Candy
 Oreka Godis as Karen
 Ini Dima-Okojie As Mimi
 Helen Paul as Freda
 Falz as AK Famzy
 Deyemi Okanlawon as Michael Idehen
 Toni Tones as Stephanie
 Emmanuel ‘EmmaOMG’ Edunjobi as Pastor Leke
 Aletile ‘Seyi Law’ Lawrence as Fred
 Bimbo Manuel As Prof Idehen
 Chigul as Madam Echejile
 Ikechukwu Onunaku as John

Plot 
A bumbling billionaire businessman and failed Presidential candidate Chief Olalekan Ajadi (Akin Lewis) is very much obsessed with US President Donald Trump. Just when his political campaign looks on the verge of another flop disaster, Ajadi is anointed by a majority party and becomes a tough credible contender with the assistance of powerful social media.

Box office 
The film grossed ₦17.5 million in its first two days and became the fourth highest grossing Nollywood film for the year 2019 with ₦105.5 million.

References

External links 

 

2019 films
Nigerian comedy-drama films
2010s English-language films
English-language Nigerian films
Films shot in Nigeria
2019 directorial debut films
2019 comedy-drama films